The 1993 Muratti Time Indoor, known as such for sponsorship reasons, was a men's tennis tournament played on indoor carpet courts at the Assago Forum in Milan, Italy that was part of the ATP Championship Series of the 1993 ATP Tour. It was the 16th edition of the tournament and was held from 8 February until 14 February 1993. Second-seeded Boris Becker won the singles title, his third at the event after 1987 and 1989.

Finals

Singles

 Boris Becker defeated  Sergi Bruguera, 6–3, 6–3
 It was Becker's 2nd singles title of the year and the 38th of his career.

Doubles

 Mark Kratzmann /  Wally Masur defeated  Tom Nijssen /  Cyril Suk, 4–6, 6–3, 6–4

References

External links
 ITF tournament edition details

Milan Indoor
Milan Indoor
Milan Indoor
Milan Indoor